Kadelli is a village in Tarsus district of Mersin Province, Turkey. A part of village (Dörtler) is on Turkish state highway . The population of village was 423  as of 2012. Main agricultural crop of the village is grape which is commercially known as Tarsus beyazı (literally "white of Tarsus"). Wheat and cotton are other products.

References

Villages in Tarsus District